Justice Rhodes may refer to:

Augustus Rhodes, chief justice of the Supreme Court of California
William Luther Rhodes, associate justice of the South Carolina Supreme Court